Loder is a surname. Notable people with the surname include:

 Andrew Loder (1826–1900), Australian politician
 Anne Marie Loder (born 1969), Canadian actress
 Benjamin Loder (1801–1876), American businessman and railroad executive
 Bernard Loder (1849–1935), Dutch jurist
 Chris Loder (born 1981), British politician
 David Loder (born 1964), English racehorse trainer
 Edward Loder (1809–1865), English composer and conductor
 George Loder (1816–1868), English composer and conductor, cousin of Edward
 Gerald Loder, 1st Baron Wakehurst (1861–1936), British barrister, businessman, and politician
 Jenna Loder (born 1988), Canadian curler
 John Loder (disambiguation), multiple people
John Loder (actor) (1898–1988), British actor
John Loder (landowner) (c.1726–1805), English clergyman, founder of the Old Berkshire Hunt
John Loder (sound engineer) (1946–2005), English founder of Southern Studios
John Loder, 2nd Baron Wakehurst (1895–1970), British politician
John David Loder (1788–1846), English violinist
 Justus Christian Loder (1753–1832), German anatomist
 Kate Loder (1825–1904), English composer and pianist
 Kellie Loder (born 1988), Canadian musician
 Kevin Loder (born 1959), American basketball player
 Kurt Loder (born 1945), American television personality
 Loder Baronets, barons of Whittlebury and High Beeches in the UK
 Louis Loder (1896–1972), Australian public servant and policymaker
 Sir Robert Loder, 1st Baronet (1823–1888), English politician
 Roy Loder (1896–1964), Australian cricketer
 Terry Loder (born 1953), Canadian politician
 Thierry Loder (born 1975), Swiss-born French cyclist

See also
 Loader (surname)
 55772 Loder, an asteroid (1992 YB5)
 Loder Cup, New Zealand conservation award
 Loders (disambiguation)
 Loader (disambiguation)

Occupational surnames
English-language surnames